Federal Highway 180 is a Mexican Federal Highway that follows Mexico's Gulf and Caribbean Coast from the Mexico-U.S. border at Brownsville, Texas, into Matamoros, Tamaulipas, to the resort city  of Cancún, Quintana Roo, in the Yucatán Peninsula. Although the highway is numbered as a west-east route, it initially follows a north-south alignment through Tamaulipas and Veracruz.

The highway is briefly interrupted from El Encinal to Soto la Marina in Tamaulipas just north of Tampico. The highway goes through Tampico south, interrupted briefly from Cerro Azul to Potrero del Llano, to the city of Poza Rica. It continues south from there through Veracruz and Coatzacoalcos. From there it goes east into Villahermosa, north through Campeche into Mérida, and finally east into Cancún.

Federal Highway 180 also connects to both Interstate 69E and U.S. Route 77 at the border. U.S. Route 83 (along with both Interstate 69E and U.S. Route 77) starts the northern terminus of Highway 180 in Brownsville, Texas, at the Veterans International Bridge on the Mexican border. After crossing the bridge into the United States, Federal Highway 180 continues as U.S. Route 83 in Brownsville which then runs northward to the U.S. highway's northern terminus, north of Westhope, North Dakota, at the Canada–United States border. From here, the highway continues further as Manitoba Highway 83 until it ends at Swan River, Manitoba. In total, the three highways total  in length.

Image gallery

See also
 Tampico Bridge
 Zacatal Bridge

References

External links 

180
180